Tiabaya District is one of the twenty-nine districts of the Arequipa Province in Peru.

References

External links
  www.munitiabaya.gob.pe Official district web site

Districts of the Arequipa Province
Districts of the Arequipa Region